Arthur Pierson may refer to:

Arthur Tappan Pierson (1837–1911), American Presbyterian pastor
Arthur N. Pierson (1867–1957), Speaker of the New Jersey General Assembly and President of the New Jersey Senate
Arthur Pierson (director) (1901–1975), American director and producer of film and television